WWE Hell in a Cell is a professional wrestling event produced annually by WWE, a Connecticut-based professional wrestling promotion. It is broadcast live and available only through pay-per-view (PPV) and the livestreaming services Peacock and the WWE Network. First held in 2009, the concept of the show comes from WWE's established Hell in a Cell match, in which competitors fight inside a 20-foot-high roofed cell structure surrounding the ring and ringside area. Each main event match of the card is contested under the Hell in a Cell stipulation, while one or two other Hell in a Cell matches may occur on the undercard.

Hell in a Cell replaced No Mercy in the October slot of WWE's pay-per-view calendar. In 2018, it was moved up to the September slot, but returned to October the following year before moving up to June in 2021. Hell in a Cell was introduced during WWE's first brand extension period, and the inaugural event featured the Raw, SmackDown, and ECW brands. ECW was disbanded in 2010 and the first brand split ended in 2011. The brand split returned in 2016, and that year's event was held exclusively for Raw, while the 2017 event was SmackDown-exclusive. Brand-exclusive PPVs were then discontinued following WrestleMania 34 in 2018. During the COVID-19 pandemic (2020–2021), Hell in a Cell was the only PPV event to be held twice in WWE's bio-secure bubble called the ThunderDome; the 2021 event was also the final PPV to be held in the ThunderDome before WWE resumed live touring in July that year.

History
In early 2009, World Wrestling Entertainment (WWE) ran a poll on their website allowing fans to pick the name for that year's October pay-per-view (PPV), which would feature the promotion's established Hell in a Cell match. Hell in a Cell was chosen over No Escape, Locked Up, and Rage in a Cage. The inaugural Hell in a Cell PPV then took place on October 4, 2009, replacing WWE's previously annual October PPV, No Mercy. While originally only available on PPV, it also became available on WWE's online streaming service, the WWE Network, beginning with the 2014 event, and then also Peacock in 2021 after the American version of the WWE Network merged under Peacock in March that year.

The event was introduced during WWE's first brand extension period, where the promotion divided its roster into brands where wrestlers were exclusively assigned to perform. The inaugural event in turn featured wrestlers from the Raw, SmackDown, and ECW brands, but it would be the only to feature ECW as the brand was disbanded in February 2010. In April 2011, the promotion ceased using its full name, with "WWE" becoming an orphaned initialism. That August, the first brand extension ended. The 2011 event was the first held following the end of the brand split and was notable for featuring the first triple threat match contested inside Hell in a Cell.

After five years, the brand extension was reinstated in 2016, with that year's event held as a Raw-exclusive PPV. This event was notable for having the first women's Hell in a Cell match, which was also the first women's match to main event a WWE PPV. The 2017 edition was then held as a SmackDown-exclusive show. It was notable for having the first Hell in a Cell match with an added stipulation of falls count anywhere, as well as the first in which a tag team championship was defended in a Hell in a Cell match. Following WrestleMania 34 in April 2018, brand-exclusive PPVs were discontinued. The 2018 event was then moved up to September, but the event moved back to October in 2019. 

The 2020 event was notable for having the first "I quit" match contested inside of the Hell in a Cell structure. Due to the COVID-19 pandemic, the event was held in WWE's bio-secure bubble called the WWE ThunderDome, which was hosted at the Amway Center in Orlando, Florida. In 2021, the event was moved up to June and was WWE's final PPV to be produced from the WWE ThunderDome—which had been relocated to the Yuengling Center in Tampa, Florida—due to the company's resumption of live touring in mid-July. As a result, Hell in a Cell was the only PPV to be held twice in the ThunderDome. In March 2022, the 2022 event was announced to also be held in June at the Allstate Arena in Rosemont, Illinois.

Concept

The concept of the show comes from WWE's established Hell in a Cell match, in which competitors fight inside a 20-foot-high roofed cell structure surrounding the ring and ringside area. Each main event match of the card is contested under the Hell in a Cell stipulation, while one or two other Hell in a Cell matches may occur on the undercard. Variants of the Hell in a Cell stipulation have been featured, some of which are "firsts," for example, the 2011 event had the first triple threat match contested inside the Hell in a Cell structure. The 2018 event also saw a redesign of the Hell in a Cell structure, which was entirely painted crimson-red and became smaller, with the wires being less pliable, making the structure stronger, yet lighter.

Events

Notes

References

External links

 
Recurring events established in 2009